Blackrock is a seaside village just to the south of Dundalk, County Louth, Ireland. The small town is in the townland of Haggardstown and part of the Dundalk metropolitan area. The population of the village is between 3,000 and 5,000.

History
In the 1950s and 1960s, Blackrock was a holiday destination for people in the landlocked counties of Monaghan and Cavan. The beach, which is pictured in colourised postcards of that era, was created with sand imported from beaches further down the coast, as sand is continually washed away contributing to the buildup of silt in Dundalk Bay. The village is enjoying a revival as a tourist resort and there remains a tradition of visiting Blackrock on 15 August (vide the Celtic feast of Lúnasa).

Since the late 1960s, Blackrock has expanded significantly and has become a dormitory village of Dundalk, and is considered part of Dundalk for census purposes. With the opening of the M1 motorway to Dublin, there has been another wave of expansion and it is also becoming a commuter town with access to north Dublin.

Blackrock beach and its promenade (incorporating Blackrock's Millennium project - a sundial which is claimed to be the largest in a public area in Ireland) is still a focal point of the village and the site of Christmas Day fundraising events, an annual raft race, annual movie festival, pumpkin festival as well as several other events throughout the year. The promenade area includes a number of restaurants and public houses.

There are views looking north over Dundalk Bay from the promenade toward the Cooley Mountains.

In common with a number of east coast locations, the beach has a gentle gradient and the sea retreats about 5 km at low tide. The exposed seabed is a mixture of sand and mud flats. It is a habitat for a variety of wader birds, including brent geese and dunlins. The River Fane (to the south of Blackrock) enters the sea as a channel crossing from south to north in front of the promenade. Even at high tide, the water level is only about 1m out to the channel, and the front has become a sailboarding venue.

Sport

Kitesurfing
Kitesurfing has become popular in the area. It is used as a location for learning when the tide is out and when the tide is in because of the shallow depths and, more often than not, flat water.

Greyhound racing
Blackrock Greyhound Stadium was a greyhound racing stadium in Sandy Lane and the racing was organised by the Blackrock Greyhound Racing Company Ltd. The first racing in Blackrock took place at 'The Field' which is now modern day Beech Park housing in 1929 but moved a very short distance to Sandy Lane during the 1930s. Olympian Pete McArdle was a greyhound trainer at the track in the early 1950s. The site closed during the 1960s and the Blackrock Community Council took over Sandy Lane in 1971.

Association football
After the closure of the greyhound track Sandy Lane became a venue for the Juveniles and then Rock Celtic Football Club.

Transport
The village is served by public transport links seven days per week. Halpenny Travel's route 169 provides services to Dundalk. Additionally, Bus Éireann routes 100 and 100X serving Dundalk, Drogheda, Dublin Airport and Dublin can be accessed on the Dublin Road in Haggardstown, approximately one mile from the village.

See also
 List of towns and villages in Ireland

References

Footnotes 

Towns and villages in County Louth